Katherine Isbister is a game and human computer interaction researcher and designer, currently a professor in computational media at the University of California, Santa Cruz.  Until June 2015, she was an associate professor at New York University, with a joint appointment in computer science and in the Game Center at the Tisch School of the Arts. At NYU, she was founding research director of the Game Innovation Lab. Isbister's research and design contributions center on how to create more compelling emotional and social qualities in games and other digital experiences. She has innovated in the areas of character/avatar/agent design and in researching and evaluating the user experience. Her book, Better Game Characters by Design: A Psychological Approach, was nominated in 2006 for a Game Developer Magazine Frontline award. She is also co-editor of a book which outlines the state of the art in user research practices in studying games, titled Game Usability: Advice from the Experts for Advancing the Player Experience.

Isbister received her Ph.D. from Stanford University, with a focus on the design of interactive characters. In 1999, she was selected as one of MIT Technology Review's Innovators under 35. In 2011, she received a Research Fellowship for Experienced Researchers from the Alexander von Humboldt Foundation. From 2014 to 2015, she held a Lenore Annenberg and Wallis Annenberg Fellow in Communication at the Stanford Center for Advanced Study in the Behavioral Sciences.

References

External links
Katherine Isbister's site
NYU Game Innovation Lab

Stanford University alumni
University of Chicago alumni
Living people
Polytechnic Institute of New York University faculty
Center for Advanced Study in the Behavioral Sciences fellows
Year of birth missing (living people)